Oskorri is a folk band formed in the Western Basque Country in 1971. It is one of the most renowned folk groups in the Basque Country, with songs such as Euskal Herrian Euskaraz becoming popular in the region. Their first album was based on Gabriel Aresti poems. The group's name in Basque means "red sunset". Year after year, highlighted by his work capacity and capacity for experimentation. They began fusing jazz with traditional Basque instruments until they have come to find a style that defined within the European folk scene. It is one of the most veteran folk bands of Euskal Herria.

Oskorri was born at the time of the Spanish Transition, in the Basque musical scene dominated by the group Ez Dok Amairu. Therefore, the language in which they sang as the lyrics of their early songs (mostly poems by Gabriel Aresti), begins with a major protest content that is tempered with age. They gave their first concert in the auditorium of the University of Deusto in March 1971, with training in highlighting and Natxo Felipe, alma mater sole founder of the group and continues in it.

Members
Natxo de Felipe
Antón Latxa
Bixente Martínez
Xabier Zeberio
Gorka Escauriaza
Íñigo Egia
Josu Zalbide

Discography
Gabriel Arestiren Oroimenez (1975)
Mosen Bernat Etxepare (1977)
Oskorri (1979)
Plazarik plaza (1980)
...eta Oskorri sortu zen (1981)
Adio Kattalina (1982)
Alemanian euskaraz (1984)
Hau hermosurie (1984)
In fraganti (1986)
Hamabost urte... eta gero hau (1987)
Datorrena datorrela (1989)
Hi ere dantzari (1991)
Badok hamairu (1992)
Landalan (1992)
25 kantu-urte (1996)
Ura (2000)
Vizcayatik... Bizkaiara (2001)
Desertore (2003)
Banda Band (2007)

External links

Official website

Spanish folk music groups
Musical groups established in 1971
Basque music bands